Linton is a village and civil parish in the Craven district of North Yorkshire, England. The population as of the 2011 census was 176. Linton Beck runs through the village and then joins the Wharfe at Linton Falls. The beck is crossed by two Grade II listed bridges on the village green, and is overlooked by Fountaine's Hospital, a Grade II* listed chapel and almshouse built in the style of Sir John Vanburgh. There is also a public house, the Fountaine Inn.

The parish church of Saint Michael and All Saints stands close to the River Wharfe.

History 
Linton was historically a parish in Staincliffe Wapentake in the West Riding of Yorkshire.  The ancient parish included the townships of Grassington, Hebden and Threshfield, all of which became separate civil parishes in 1866.  Linton was transferred to North Yorkshire in 1974.

Linton Falls
Linton Falls on the River Wharfe consists of a natural limestone waterfall (crossed by a footbridge) and a pair of artificial weirs. The Linton Falls hydroelectric plant was built above the falls in 1909 but later abandoned in 1948. In 2012 it was restored to generate electricity once more. Near the falls is a Grade II listed packhorse bridge over Linton Beck known as Little (or Li'le) Emily's Bridge.

Notable people
 
 
Sheila Bownas (1925–2007), textile designer and botanical illustrator

Gallery

References

External links

Villages in North Yorkshire
Civil parishes in North Yorkshire
Wharfedale